The Days of Yore is a British play by Richard Cumberland. It was first staged at the Covent Garden Theatre on 13 January 1796. The work is set in the Anglo-Saxon era. The work was possibly influenced by Horace Walpole's gothic novel The Mysterious Mother. It ran for five performances.

References

Bibliography
 Chew, Samuel C. & Altick, Richard Daniel. A Literary History of England, Volume IV: The Nineteenth Century and After. Meredith Publishing Company, 1967.
 Frank, Frederick S (ed.). The Castle of Otranto and The Mysterious Mother. Broadview Press, 2003.
 Watson, George. ''The New Cambridge Bibliography of English Literature: Volume 2, 1660-1800. Cambridge University Press, 1971.

Plays by Richard Cumberland
1796 plays
West End plays
Plays set in the Middle Ages
Plays set in England